Vissenaken is a village in Belgium.  It is part (deelgemeente) of the municipality Tienen.

It is located north of the city of Tienen and is divided into two parishes: Sint-Maartens and Sint-Pieters.

The saint Himelin is known only in Vissenaken.

Origin of the name
Old Latin and Dutch names: 1147 Fennache, 1214 vissnake, 1217 de Fenaco, 1226 Vesnaken. Vissenaken can be reconstituted as *Fassiniacas: this is the German name Fasso + the adjective iniacas. Vissenaken thus means: with the people of Fasso.

Pictures

References

Populated places in Flemish Brabant
Tienen